Saint Helena, Ascension and Tristan da Cunha, a British Overseas Territory, does not have its own flag; however, the three administrative divisions do have their own flags:

Territory flag

Saint Helena

Ascension Island

Tristan da Cunha

Governor's and Administrator's Flag

Saint Helena

Tristan da Cunha

Historical

Saint Helena

Ascension Island

References 

Saint Helena, Ascension and Tristan da Cunha
Saint Helena, Ascension and Tristan da Cunha
Saint Helena, Ascension and Tristan da Cunha culture
Saint Helena, Ascension and Tristan da Cunha-related lists
Flag
Flag
Flags of British Overseas Territories